"M.V.P." is a song recorded by American rapper Big L. The song was written by Big L and produced by Lord Finesse for Big L's debut studio album Lifestylez ov da Poor and Dangerous. It was released in 1995 through Columbia Records as the second single from the album along with a "Summer Smooth Mix" featuring singer/songwriter Indoe. The original version samples "Stay With Me" by DeBarge. The acronym M.V.P. usually stands for 'most valuable player' in sports and e-sports settings. In the song, however, Big L takes it to stand for "most valuable poet".

Charts

References

External links
M.V.P. Single at Discogs
M.V.P. Lyrics at Genius

1995 singles
Big L songs
Gangsta rap songs
Music videos directed by Brian Luvar